Olvi Kola (also Romanized as ‘Olvī Kolā; also known as Ayvī Kolā) is a village in Kelarestaq-e Sharqi Rural District, in the Central District of Chalus County, Mazandaran Province, Iran. At the 2006 census, its population was 4,142, in 1,089 families.

References 

Populated places in Chalus County